Neptunea is a genus of large sea snails, marine gastropod mollusks in the subfamily Neptuneinae  of the family Buccinidae, the true whelks.

Species
According to the World Register of Marine Species (WoRMS), the following species with valid names are included within the genus Neptunea :

 Neptunea acutispiralis Okutani, 1968
 Neptunea alabaster Alexeyev & Fraussen, 2005
 Neptunea alexeyevi Fraussen & Terryn, 2007
 Neptunea amianta (Dall, 1890)
 † Neptunea angulata  Harmer, 1914 
 Neptunea antiqua (Linnaeus, 1758)
 Neptunea arthritica (Valenciennes, 1858)
 Neptunea aurigena Fraussen & Terry, 2007
 Neptunea beringiana (Middendorff, 1848)
 Neptunea borealis (Philippi, 1850)
 Neptunea bulbacea (Valenciennes, 1858)
 Neptunea communis (Middendorff, 1848)
 Neptunea constricta (Dall, 1907)
 Neptunea contraria (Linnaeus, 1771)
 Neptunea convexa Goryachev, 1978
 Neptunea costaria Fraussen & Terryn, 2007
 Neptunea cumingii Crosse, 1862
 Neptunea cuspidis Fraussen & Terryn, 2007
 Neptunea cybaea Fraussen & Terryn, 2007
 Neptunea decemcostata (Say, 1826)
 Neptunea denselirata Brøgger, 1901
 Neptunea despecta (Linnaeus, 1758)
 Neptunea elegantula Ito & Habe, 1965
 Neptunea ennae Sakurai & Chiba, 1969
 Neptunea eulimata (Dall, 1907)
 Neptunea excelsior Fraussen & Terryn, 2017
 Neptunea frater (Pilsbry, 1901)
 Neptunea fukueae Kuroda in Kira, 1955
 Neptunea gulbini Goryachev & Kantor, 1983
 Neptunea gyroscopoides Fraussen & Terryn, 2007
 Neptunea hedychra Fraussen & Terryn, 2007
 Neptunea heros Gray, 1850
 Neptunea hesperica Fraussen & Terryn, 2007
 Neptunea hiberna Fraussen & Terryn, 2007
 Neptunea humboltiana Smith, 1971
 Neptunea insularis (Dall, 1895)
 Neptunea intersculpta (G.B. Sowerby III, 1899)
 † Neptunea inversa Harmer, 1918 
 Neptunea ithia (Dall, 1891)
 Neptunea jagudinae Goryachev & Kantor, 1983
 Neptunea kuroshio Oyama in Kira, 1959
 Neptunea laeva Golikov, Goryachev & Kantor, 1987
 Neptunea lamellosa Golikov, 1962
 Neptunea laticostata Golikov, 1962
 Neptunea lyrata Gmelin, 1791
 Neptunea magnanimita Fraussen & Terryn, 2007
 Neptunea mcleani R. N. Clark, 2020
 Neptunea meridionalis Smith, 1971
 Neptunea middendorffiana MacGinitie, 1959
 Neptunea mikawaensis T. Nakano, Kurihara, Miyoshi & Higuchi, 2010
 Neptunea multistriata (Aurivillius, 1885)
 Neptunea nivea Okutani, 1981
 Neptunea nodositella Fraussen & Terryn, 2007
 Neptunea occaecata Fraussen & Terryn, 2007
 Neptunea ochotensis Golikov, 1962
 Neptunea onchodes (Dall, 1907)
 Neptunea phoenicea (Dall, 1907)
 Neptunea polycostata Scarlato in Galkin et Scarlato, 1955
 Neptunea pribiloffensis (Dall, 1919)
 Neptunea purpurea Tiba, 1983
 Neptunea robusta Okutani, 1964
 Neptunea rugosa Golikov, 1962
 Neptunea smirnia (Dall, 1919)
 Neptunea stilesi Smith, 1968
 † Neptunea stonei (Pilsbry, 1892) 
 Neptunea subdilatata (Yen, 1936)
 Neptunea tabulata (Baird, 1863)
 Neptunea tuberculata (Yokoyama, 1929)
 Neptunea umbratica Fraussen & Terryn, 2007
 Neptunea varicifera (Dall, 1907)
 Neptunea ventricosa (Gmelin, 1791)
 Neptunea vinlandica Fraussen & Terryn, 2007
 Neptunea vinosa (Dall, 1919)
 Neptunea vladivostokensis (Bartsch, 1929)

Species brought into synonymy 
 Neptunea (Trophonopsis): synonym of Trophonopsis Bucquoy, Dautzenberg & Dollfus, 1882
 Neptunea (Trophonopsis) lasia Dall, 1919: synonym of Scabrotrophon lasius (Dall, 1919)
 Neptunea apolyonis Dall, 1919: synonym of Boreotrophon apolyonis (Dall, 1919)
 Neptunea arthritica (Bernardi, 1857): synonym of Barbitonia arthritica (Valenciennes, 1858)
 Neptunea beringi (Dall, 1902): synonym of Boreotrophon clathratus (Linnaeus, 1767)
 Neptunea berniciensis (King, 1846): synonym of Troschelia berniciensis (King, 1846)
 Neptunea bonaespei Barnard, 1963: synonym of Buccipagoda bonaespei (Barnard, 1963)
 Neptunea brevicauda (Deshayes, 1832): synonym of Aulacofusus brevicauda (Deshayes, 1832)
 Neptunea caelata Verrill, 1880: synonym of Retimohnia caelata (Verrill & Smith in Verrill, 1880)
 Neptunea callicerata Dall, 1919: synonym of Boreotrophon avalonensis Dall, 1902
 Neptunea cincta Link, 1807: synonym of Filifusus filamentosus (Röding, 1798)
 Neptunea dalli Friele, 1882: synonym of Granulifusus dalli (Watson, 1882)
 Neptunea danielsseni (Friele, 1879): synonym of Mohnia danielsseni (Friele, 1879)
 Neptunea denselirata Brögger, 1901: synonym of Neptunea despecta (Linnaeus, 1758)
 Neptunea doliata Röding, 1798: synonym of Gelagna succincta (Linnaeus, 1771)
 Neptunea ecaudata Link, 1807: synonym of Latirus gibbulus (Gmelin, 1791)
 Neptunea ecaudis Locard, 1897: synonym of Turrisipho fenestratus (Turton, 1834)
 Neptunea elegantula Dall, 1907: synonym of Boreotrophon elegantulus (Dall, 1907)
 Neptunea fasciata Jaeckel, 1952: synonym of Neptunea despecta (Linnaeus, 1758)
 Neptunea hanseni Friele, 1879: synonym of Colus sabini (Gray, 1824)
 Neptunea ithitoma Dall, 1919: synonym of Boreotrophon alaskanus Dall, 1902
 Neptunea kotakamaruae Ito & Habe, 1965: synonym of Neptunea elegantula Ito & Habe, 1965
 Neptunea lachesis (Mörch, 1869): synonym of Turrisipho lachesis (Mörch, 1869)
 Neptunea laevigata Link, 1807: synonym of Fasciolaria tulipa (Linnaeus, 1758)
 Neptunea lurida A. Adams, 1863: synonym of Barbitonia arthritica (Valenciennes, 1858)
 Neptunea magellanicus Röding, 1798: synonym of Fusitriton magellanicus (Röding, 1798)
 Neptunea middendorffiana MacGinitie, 1959: synonym of Neptunea heros Gray, 1850
 Neptunea minor (Hirase, 1908): synonym of Neptunea kuroshio Oyama in Kira, 1959
 Neptunea oncoda (Dall, 1907): synonym of Neptunea onchodes (Dall, 1907)
 Neptunea ossiania Friele, 1879: synonym of Beringius ossianius (Friele, 1879)
 Neptunea peregra Locard, 1897: synonym of Turrisipho fenestratus (Turton, 1834)
 Neptunea pertenuis Sykes, 1911: synonym of Retifusus latericeus (Møller, 1842)
 Neptunea pusilla Röding, 1798: synonym of Nassaria pusilla (Röding, 1798)
 Neptunea satura (Martyn, 1784): synonym of Neptunea ventricosa (Gmelin, 1791)
 Neptunea soluta (Hermann, 1781): synonym of Buccinum undatum Linnaeus, 1758
 Neptunea staphylina Dall, 1919: synonym of Boreotrophon bentleyi Dall, 1908
 Neptunea taeniata (G.B. Sowerby II, 1880): synonym of Neptunea cumingii Crosse, 1862
 Neptunea terebralis Gould, 1860: synonym of Aulacofusus brevicauda (Deshayes, 1832)
 Neptunea tolomia Dall, 1919: synonym of Boreotrophon tolomius (Dall, 1919)
 Neptunea virgata Friele, 1879: synonym of Anomalisipho verkruezeni (Kobelt, 1876)

References

 Vaught, K.C. (1989). A classification of the living Mollusca. American Malacologists: Melbourne, FL (USA). . XII, 195 pp
 Gofas, S.; Le Renard, J.; Bouchet, P. (2001). Mollusca, in: Costello, M.J. et al. (Ed.) (2001). European register of marine species: a check-list of the marine species in Europe and a bibliography of guides to their identification. Collection Patrimoines Naturels, 50: pp. 180–213

External links 

Buccinidae
Gastropod genera
nl:Neptunea angulata